Gregory Charles Sisk is an American legal scholar.

Sisk earned his bachelor's degree from Montana State University and studied law at the University of Washington School of Law. He taught for twelve years at the Drake University School of Law, where he held the Richard M. & Anita Calkins Distinguished Professorship, before joining the University of St. Thomas School of Law in 2003, where he is the Pio Cardinal Laghi Distinguished Chair in Law. Sisk is an elected member of the American Law Institute.

References

Living people
American legal scholars
University of St. Thomas (Minnesota) faculty
University of Washington School of Law alumni
Drake University faculty
Montana State University alumni
Members of the American Law Institute
Year of birth missing (living people)